Kudarikilu (Dhivehi: ކުޑަރިކިލު) is one of the inhabited islands of Southern Maalhosmadulhu Atoll (Baa Atoll).

Geography

Middle Maalhosmadulhu
In addition, there are 10 smaller, uninhabited islets on the rim of the atoll. The Atoll is separated from North Maalhosmadulhu by a deep channel (Moresby Channel in the Admiralty chart) and from the southern part of South Maalhosmadulhu by a narrower channel running from east to west.

Demography

References

Divehiraajjege Jōgrafīge Vanavaru. Muhammadu Ibrahim Lutfee. G.Sōsanī. Malé 1999. 
The Islands of Maldives. Hasan A. Maniku. Novelty. Male 1983. 

Islands of the Maldives